Van C. Gessel (born August 1, 1950, Compton, California) is a former Dean of the BYU College of Humanities at Brigham Young University.  He also served as chair of the Department of Asian and Near Eastern Languages at BYU.  He has become renowned for his work as the primary translator for Japanese novelist Endo Shusaku.  He is also a prominent editor of several Japanese translations including The Columbia Anthology of Modern Japanese Literature (Volume 1 published in 2005, Volume 2 in 2007).

Biography
Gessel is a graduate of the University of Utah from which he received a bachelor's degree and Columbia University from which he received a PhD in Japanese literature in 1979.  He has taught as a faculty member at Columbia University, Notre Dame, UC Berkeley, and Brigham Young University. He has served as a bishop, stake president, and the president of the Portland, Oregon Mission (2005-2008) of the Church of Jesus Christ of Latter-day Saints.  Gessel and his wife Elizabeth have three children.  In 2016, Gessel received a rare commendation from the Foreign Minister of Japan for "outstanding contributions to mutual understanding and goodwill between Japan and other nations".  On April 29, 2018, Gessel was honored by the Emperor of Japan with the Order of the Rising Sun for his outstanding work in Japanese literature, promoting mutual understanding between the United States and Japan. Gessel was awarded the Lindsley and Masao Miyoshi Translation Prize in 2020-2021 for lifetime achievement as a translator of modern Japanese fiction.

As the primary translator for novelist Endo Shusaku Gessel has translated eight novels from Japanese to English and consulted on the adaptation film by Martin Scorsese, Silence.

Written works
Japanese Fiction Writers Since WWII
Three Modern Novelists
The Sting of Life

Translations
When I Whistle (1974) by Endo Shusaku
The Samurai (1980) by Endo Shusaku
Scandal (1986) by Endo Shusaku
Stained Glass Elegies (1990) by Endo Shusaku
Deep River (1993) by Endo Shusaku
The Final Martyrs (1993) by Endo Shusaku
Five by Endo(2000)  by Endo Shusaku
Kiku's Prayer (2012) by Endo Shusaku
Sachiko: A Novel (2020) by Endo Shusaku

Edited Works
Taking the Gospel to the Japanese: 1901 to 2001
The Shōwa Anthology
The Shōwa Anthology II
The Columbia Anthology of Modern Japanese Literature (Volume 1 published in 2005, Volume 2 in 2007)

See also
Shūsaku Endō

References

1950 births
Living people
Brigham Young University alumni
Brigham Young University faculty
Mission presidents (LDS Church)
American Mormon missionaries in Japan
People from Compton, California
21st-century Mormon missionaries
American Mormon missionaries in the United States
American Japanologists
American leaders of the Church of Jesus Christ of Latter-day Saints
21st-century American translators
Latter Day Saints from California
Latter Day Saints from Indiana
Latter Day Saints from New York (state)
Latter Day Saints from Utah
Missionary linguists